Puszta or praedium, uninhabited area in Arad county, Romania, first mentioned in documents in 1743.

In 1828, the Hungarian census recorded here one house with 7 inhabitants. In 1852 and then in 1853 it was settled with farmers coming from Csernovics Ujfalu puszta and Bánkuta puszta, respectively, both places now in SE Hungary). As a result, two new villages were formed: first Zimand Ujfalu (Zimandu Nou) in 1852 and in 1853 Zimandköz (first called Bánkút-Zimand, later renamed Zimand-Bánkút, then Zimandköz and today Zimandköz/Zimandcuz).

 Communes and villages in Transylvania